Socialismo tascabile (Prove tecniche di trasmissione) is the debut album by Italian indie/electronica band Offlaga Disco Pax. It was released in 2005 and received mostly positive reviews.

Track listing
songs written by Collini and Fontanelli, except where indicated.
 "Kappler" (Collini, Carretti) (5:25)
 "Enver" (4:54)
 "Khmer Rossa" (5:36)
 "Cinnamon" (4:28)
 "Tono Metallico Standard" (Collini, Carretti) (5:04)
 "Tatranky" (8:16)
 "Robespierre" (3:35)
 "Piccola Pietroburgo" (5:58)
 "De Fonseca" (Collini, Carretti) (11:37)

Thematic elements
The title can be translated as Pocket socialism (broadcast test techniques).

Collini's lyrics are filled with references to people and places from the past, mostly from the Italian years of lead. Among the political figures mentioned on the album are Enver Hoxha, Georgi Dimitrov, Rosa Luxemburg, Malcolm X, Antonio Gramsci, Alexander Dubček, Maximilien Robespierre, Enrico Berlinguer, Marco Pannella, Ronald Reagan, Karl Marx, Ho Chi Minh, Che Guevara, Dolores Ibárruri, Josip Broz Tito, Kim Il Sung and Vladimir Lenin. A range of confectionery products, including Cinnamon-flavoured bubblegum and Tatranky wafers, is also mentioned, carrying several political metaphors: the commercial disappearance of these products is compared to the decadence of communism. Collini cites several musicians, including Mark Lanegan and his band Screaming Trees, the punk band Dead Kennedys, the hard rock band Van Halen and several new wave and synthpop acts such as Depeche Mode, Modern Talking and Nik Kershaw. Actual life happenings are also translated into lyrics in several songs.

"Kappler"
Herbert Kappler
Matura
"Enver"
Enver Hoxha
"Khmer Rossa"
Georgi Dimitrov
Vladimir Mayakovsky
Filippo Turati
Pietro Nenni
Khmer Rouge, the ruling political party of Cambodia from 1975 to 1979.
The October Revolution
Rosa Luxemburg
Stalingrad
"Cinnamon"
Cinnamon-flavoured bubblegum
Koper, Slovenia (Italian: Capodistria)
The Black Panther Party
Malcolm X
Stimorol chewing gum
Antonio Gramsci
Big Babol chewing gum (manufactured by Perfetti Van Melle)
"Tono Metallico Standard"
Standa, an Italian chain of department stores.
Mark Lanegan
Screaming Trees
Dead Kennedys
"Tatranky"
Prague
Leonid Brezhnev
Marxism
Modern Talking
Samantha Fox
Nik Kershaw
Al Bano and Romina Power
Depeche Mode
Alexander Dubček
Škoda Auto
Tatranky wafers, once produced in the Czech Republic but now manufactured by the Groupe Danone
Loacker wafers
"Robespierre"
Maximilien Robespierre
Jacobins
Space Invaders
Enrico Berlinguer
Alberto Juantorena
Sandinismo in Nicaragua
Marco Pannella
Marlboro cigarettes
The NSU Prinz
Anna Oxa
The Festival della canzone italiana
Van Halen
Jarmila Kratochvílová
Toblerone chocolate
American bombing of Tripoli and Benghazi, Libya, which occurred on 15 April 1986.
Ronald Reagan
Karl Marx
Ho Chi Minh
Che Guevara
Dolores Ibárruri
Stalingrad
Josip Broz Tito
Vladimir Lenin
The village of Cavriago
The Italian Communist Party
The Democrazia Cristiana party
"Piccola Pietroburgo"
Italian singer Orietta Berti
Vladimir Lenin
The village of Cavriago
Reggio Emilia
Kim Il Sung
Enver Hoxha
The Festa de l'Unità
Jukka Reverberi of the band Giardini di Mirò
Civitavecchia
Komsomolskaya Pravda
Arkhangelsk
"De Fonseca"
De Fonseca, an Italian brand of slippers

Line-up
 Enrico Fontanelli – bass, keyboards
 Daniele Carretti – guitar, bass
 Max Collini – vocals

Other musicians
 Francesco "Burro" Donadello – drums in Enver and Cinnamon
 Daniela "Comaneci" Roman – vocals in Khmer Rossa

References

External links
 Robespierre video
 Offlaga Disco Pax's blog

2005 albums
Offlaga Disco Pax albums